Janna Ireland (born 1985) is an African-American photographer based in Los Angeles.

Biography 
Janna Ireland was born in 1985 in Philadelphia.  She studied photography at NYU, received her MFA at UCLA, and now lives and works in Los Angeles. Ireland photographs a wide range of subject matter from portraits and still lifes to the urban landscape, and her photographs have been exhibited internationally. Since 2016, she has photographed the buildings designed by African-American architect, Paul R. Williams, who was the first black architect admitted to the American Institute of Architecture (AIA). In 2020, she published a book featuring 200 of these photographs, which were collected in a volume titled, Regarding Paul R. Williams: A Photographer’s View. Ireland continued her work on Paul R. Williams as a Peter E. Pool Research Fellow at the Nevada Museum of Art. In 2022, an exhibition of her photographs of Williams' Nevada buildings opened at the Nevada Museum of Art.  She is an assistant professor in the Department of Art and Art History at Occidental College.

Education 
Janna Ireland is a graduate of the Philadelphia High School for Creative and Performing Arts in 2003, where she earned her major in creative writing. She received her BFA in Photography and Imaging from NYU Tisch School of Arts in 2007. She earned her MFA in art in 2013 from the University of California, Los Angeles.

Artworks 
Ireland has an extensive career in editorial photography, and her work has appeared in The New York Times Magazine, The Atlantic, Architectural Digest, Introspective Magazine, the Los Angeles Review of Books, The New Yorker, Harper's Magazine, and L.A. Magazine.

She is best known for her series of photographs of buildings designed by African-American architect, Paul R. Williams.  Beginning in 2016, she traveled around southern California photographing the buildings that he designed at the height of his career, from the 1920s-1940s. She has photographed several dozen structures designed by Williams.

Exhibitions

Solo exhibitions

Selected group exhibitions

Collections 
Janna Ireland's photographs are held in the permanent collections of major metropolitan museums including, the Los Angeles County Museum of Art, the California African American Museum, the Santa Barbara Museum of Art, and the Museum of Contemporary Photography.

Honors and awards

Authored books 
 Janna Ireland, Regarding Paul R. Williams: A Photographer’s View. Santa Monica: Angel City Press, 2020

See also 

 List of black photographers

References 

University of California, Los Angeles alumni
African-American photographers
People from Philadelphia
New York University alumni
Philadelphia High School for the Creative and Performing Arts alumni
1985 births
Living people
21st-century African-American people
20th-century African-American people